Five Moons Square (also known as Five Moons Plaza and Piazza Of The Five Moons) is a 2003  Italian political thriller film written and directed by Renzo Martinelli. It is inspired by the story of the kidnapping and murder of Italian politician Aldo Moro by the Red Brigades terrorist group, of which the film suggests a possible reconstruction within a fictive conspiracy-theory.

Plot

Cast 
Donald Sutherland: Judge Rosario Saracini 
Giancarlo Giannini: Branco 
Stefania Rocca: Fernanda 
F. Murray Abraham: The "Entity"
Aisha Cerami: Ombretta
Greg Wise: Francesco Doni
Nicola Di Pinto: Antiquary

References

External links

2003 films
Italian thriller drama films
Films set in Rome
Films set in Siena
2003 thriller drama films
English-language Italian films
Films directed by Renzo Martinelli
2003 drama films
2000s English-language films
2000s Italian films